Åkesson is a surname. Notable people with the surname include:

Elner Åkesson (1890–1962), Swedish cinematographer
Fredrik Åkesson, Swedish heavy metal guitarist
Jimmie Åkesson (born 1979), the leader of Swedish nationalist political party, the Sweden Democrats
Joel Åkesson (born 1991), a Swedish professional ice hockey player
Lena Åkesson (born 1967), former world-class female professional boxer in the late 1990s
Ralf Åkesson (born 1961), Swedish chess grandmaster
Sonja Åkesson (1926–1977), Swedish writer, poet and artist from Buttle, a settlement on the Swedish island of Gotland
Stefan Åkesson, Swedish Pro freestyle skateboarder, actor and web designer
Vagn Ákason, Norseman of the late 10th century, mentioned in the Jómsvíkinga saga

See also
Clas Åkesson Tott (1530–1590), military Field Marshal (1572) and member of the Privy Council of Sweden (1575)